A coupé utility is a vehicle with a passenger compartment at the front and an integrated cargo tray at the rear, with the front of the cargo bed doubling as the rear of the passenger compartment.

The term originated in the 1930s, where it was used to distinguish passenger-car-based two-door vehicles with an integrated cargo tray from traditional pickup trucks that have a separate cargo bed from the passenger compartment. Since the 2000s, this type of vehicle has also been referred to as a "pick-up", "car-based pick-up" or "car-based truck".

In Australia, where the traditional style of coupé utility remained popular until it ceased production in 2017, it is commonly called a "ute" (pronounced [juːt]), although the term is also used there to describe traditional-style pickups.

History

The body style originated in Australia. It was the result of a 1932 letter from the wife of a farmer in Victoria, Australia, to Ford Australia asking for "a vehicle to go to church in on a Sunday and which can carry our pigs to market on Mondays". In response, Ford designer Lew Bandt developed a vehicle to meet the client's request. Commencing in October 1933, with assistance from draftsman A. Scott, Bandt used the passenger compartment and roof from the Ford V8 five-window coupe and extended the rear section using a single fixed side panel on each side, with a hinged tailgate at the rear to create the load carrying compartment.

The model was released in July 1934 as the coupe utility. In his book "Early Australian Automotive Design: The First Fifty Years", Australian motoring historian Norm Darwin suggests the idea was not a big leap in design from existing roadster utility models produced by various manufacturers as early as 1924. Darwin also suggests that the idea was being developed by other manufacturers simultaneously, because General Motors-Holden released Bedford and Chevrolet coupe utilities in September 1934, only two months after Ford, with the main difference being the use of the three-window coupe roof on the GM-H products. Other manufacturers were quick to follow, with coupe utilities based on various passenger and light truck chassis.

In North America, the idea was also trialed by some manufacturers. Studebaker created the Studebaker Coupe Express and sold it between 1937-1939.

In 1951, Holden released a model based on its 48-215 sedan, reinforcing the Australian tradition of home-grown two-door passenger-car sedan chassis-based "utility" vehicles with a tray at the back, known colloquially as a "ute", although the term was also applied to larger vehicles such as pickup trucks.

America followed suit with the release of the Ford Ranchero in 1957 and Chevrolet El Camino in 1959.

North American models

Chevrolet El Camino

The Chevrolet El Camino is a coupé utility/pickup vehicle produced by Chevrolet from 1959 to 1960 and from 1964 to 1987.

Introduced in 1958 (for the 1959 model year) in response to the success of the Ford Ranchero pickup, its first run lasted only two years. Production resumed in 1963 (for the 1964 model year) based on the Chevelle A-platform. In 1977 (for the 1978 model year), it was shifted to the GM G-body platform. Production finished in 1987.

Although based on corresponding Chevrolet car lines, the vehicle is classified and titled in North America as a truck. GMC's badge-engineered El Camino variant, the Sprint, was introduced in 1970 (for the 1971 model year). It was renamed Caballero in 1977 (for the 1978 model year), and produced until 1987.

In Spanish, el camino means "the road" and is related to the verb "caminar" (to walk).

Other North American coupé utilities

 1936–1942 Chevrolet Coupe Delivery
 1982–1984 Dodge Rampage
 1981–1982 Ford Durango
 1957–1959 Ford Ranchero (full-size)
 1960–1965 Ford Falcon Ranchero (Falcon compact)
 1966–1979 Ford Ranchero (mid-size)
 1971–1987 GMC Sprint / Caballero (GMC rebadge of the El Camino)
 1937–1939 Studebaker Coupe Express 
 1983 Plymouth Scamp

South American models

Since the 1970s, utes have been built in Brazil under European car-maker badges, usually based on hatchbacks. For example, the Ford Courier was based on the Ford Fiesta MkIV. Current examples include the Chevrolet Montana, based on the Opel Corsa and later on the Chevrolet Agile, the Peugeot Hoggar, based on the South American Peugeot 207, the Volkswagen Saveiro, based on the Volkswagen Gol, and the Fiat Strada, based on the Fiat Palio.

Other South American coupé utility models:

 1983–1994 Chevrolet Chevy 500 (Brazil)
 2003–2021 Chevrolet Montana
 1994–2004 Chevrolet Corsa Pick Up (Argentina and Brazil)
 1953–1979 Citroën 2CV "Citroneta" (South America only)
 1971–1990 Dodge 1500 (Uruguay)
 1996–present Fiat Strada
 1998–2013 Ford Courier (Brazil) 
 1973–1991 Ford Falcon Ranchero (Argentina)
 1982–1997 Ford Pampa (Brazil)
 2010–2014 Peugeot Hoggar
 2015–present Ram 700 (Mexico-exclusive rebadged version of the Fiat Strada)
 1980–present Volkswagen Saveiro/Pointer coupé utility

Asian models

 1991–1995 Daihatsu Mira P1/Miracab
 2004–2007 Geely Rural Nanny
 1975–1990 Hyundai Pony 
 1965–1971 Mitsubishi Colt 800 
 1971–2007 Nissan Sunny 
 1990–1998 Nissan NV (Thailand domestic models built under license)
 1955–1957 Prince Commercial Pickup AIPC-1/AIPC-2
 1957–1967 Prince Skyway pickup
 2002–2010 Proton Arena/Jumbuck
 2002–2006 Subaru Baja (sold in the United States, Canada and Chile)
 1978–1993 Subaru BRAT/Brumby/Shifter/MV/Targa
 1983–1988 Suzuki Mighty Boy
 2000–2001 Toyota bB Open Deck
 1960–1969 Toyota Corona coupé utility
 1959–1971 Toyopet/Toyota Crown Masterline coupé utility
 1955–1959 Toyopet Masterline
 1968–1974 Toyota Mark II coupé utility
 1964–1988 Toyota Publica coupé utility/Toyota coupé utility

South African models

Australian Holden Kingswood, Ford Falcon and Chrysler Valiant utes were sold in South Africa as the Chevrolet El Camino, Ford Ranchero, and Valiant Rustler respectively. Some re-badged versions of South American utes are sold in South Africa (where the term "bakkie" instead of "ute" is popular) under different names, such as the Chevrolet Montana and the Ford Courier, sold there as Chevrolet Utility and Ford Bantam respectively.

Other South African coupé utility models:
 1975–1979 Dodge Husky (South Africa)
 1989–2002 Mazda Rustler (rebadged 2nd generation Ford Bantam)
 2008–present Nissan NP200 (rebadged Dacia Logan Pick-Up, built and sold in South Africa)

European models

Austin Marina
A coupé utility, based on the 1971–1980 Morris Marina, with a 1275 cc engine, was badged as an Austin. Not many of them were sold.

Mini
Variously badged pick-up variants were built on the chassis of the Mini estate/wagon.

Other European coupé utilities
 1949–1952 Armstrong Siddeley Whitley 18 Utility Coupé
 1949–1952 Armstrong Siddeley Whitley 18 Station Coupé (extended cab with a rear seat)
 1956 Austin A35
 1957–1973 Austin A55 Cambridge
 1950–1954 Austin A70 Hereford
 Commer Light Pick-up (commercial variant of the Hillman Minx)
 2007–2012 Dacia Logan Pick-Up 
 1975–2012 Dacia Logan/Logan II
 1972–1982 Emelba 127 Poker
 1977–2013 Fiat Fiorino
 1974–2001 IZh-27151
 1955–1966 Peugeot 403 
 1979–1996 Peugeot 504
 1975–1985 Simca 1100 
 1991–1995 Škoda Pick-up
 1994–2001 Škoda Felicia Pickup/Fun
 1954–1960 Standard 6 cwt utility (commercial variant of the Standard Ten)
 1950–1964 Standard Vanguard utility (also sold as "Standard Pick-up Truck")
 1979–2007 Volkswagen Caddy Typ 14/Rabbit coupé utility
 1996–2001 Volkswagen Caddy Typ 9U (rebadged Škoda Felicia coupé utility)
  Singer SM1500
 1966–1991 Wartburg 353 "Trans"

Middle Eastern models
 1967–2005 Paykan coupé utility (Iran)
 2015–present IKCO Arisun
 2008–present SAIPA Pick-Up

Australian models

Coupe utilities have been produced in Australia since the 1930s. The three major Australian manufacturers (GM-Holden, Ford and Chrysler) offered coupe utility versions of their most popular models, and many of the smaller manufacturers also offered coupe utilities in their range. In many cases, if a coupe utility was not available as part of the regular model range an aftermarket coachbuilder would build one to customer order. Coupe utilities were also offered by various manufacturers on light truck style chassis, alongside their regular style pickup and cab-chassis offerings.

Examples include:

Ford
 1934–1940 Ford coupe utility
 1941–1948 Ford
 1949–1951 Ford
 1946–1953 Ford Anglia A54A (1946–48) and Anglia A494A (1949–53)
 1956–1962 Ford Consul Mark II and Ford Zephyr Mark II
 1960–1999 Ford Falcon (from 1999–2016 the Falcon utility had a separate pick up bed and was therefore no longer strictly a coupe utility)
 1952–1959 Ford Mainline
 1949–1951 Ford Pilot
 1953–1955 Ford Popular 103E
 1939–1953 Ford Prefect E93A/E03A (1939–45), Ford Prefect A53A (1946–48) and Prefect A493A (1948–53)
 1937–1938 Ford Ten 6 cwt coupe utility
 1946–1958 Mercury Club Coupe Utility
 1989–1991 Nissan Ute (badge engineered version of the Ford Falcon (XF) utility)
General Motors-Holden
 From 1934 various GM chassis were available fitted with coupe utility bodywork
 Bedford HC 6 cwt Carryall (commercial variant of the Vauxhall 10-4)
 1946–1948 Chevrolet Stylemaster
 1949–1952 Chevrolet Styleline
 1951–1968 Holden
 1990–2017 Holden Commodore/Holden Ute (models from 2000–2017 were marketed as Holden Utes not Commodores)
 1968–1984 Belmont/Kingswood
 1952–1954 Vauxhall Wyvern E series and 1952–1957 Velox E Series
Chrysler
 From 1935, various Dodge, Plymouth and Fargo chassis were available fitted with coupe utility bodywork
 1958–1961 Chrysler Wayfarer
 1965–1971 Chrysler Valiant/Valiant Wayfarer
 1971–1978 Chrysler Valiant
 1956–1957 DeSoto Diplomat
 1966–1976 Dodge (lower spec version of the Valiant/Wayfarer utility)
 1956–1957 Dodge Kingsway
 1956–1957 Plymouth Cranbrook/Savoy/Belvedere
BMC
 Austin A40 Devon (Several unique variants were offered on the Australian market, including the Austin A40 Panelside and the A40 Hi-Lite)
 1956 Austin A50
 Austin A55 Cambridge
 1968–1971 Austin 1800
Standard
 Morris Eight Series II, Series E and Series Z
 Standard Vanguard
 Triumph Maylower
Rootes Group
 1939 Hillman Fourteen
 1956 Hillman deluxe utility based on Mark VIII Hillman Minx
Lightburn
Zeta utility

Prototypes

 AMC Cowboy: Derived from the Hornet, it was intended to compete with small pickups from Japan, but the project was canceled after AMC acquired Jeep, which already sold small pickups.
 Austin Metro Ranger: A concept based on the first generation model, it featured a full roll bar, flood lights, and a rear-mounted spare.
 BMW M3 ute/pickup: On April Fools' Day 2011, BMW announced the BMW M3 ute/pickup. This vehicle was based on the E93 Convertible and featured a structured aluminum pickup bed and removable targa roof. It was created by BMW's M Division as a one-off workshop transport vehicle for use within the company.  It was actually the second such ute that BMW built for this purpose: they had previously built one using a first generation M3 convertible in 1986.  This coupe ute served the factory for 26 years before the April Fools car was built to replace it.
 Pontiac G8 ST: A rebadged Holden Ute (which is based on the Holden Commodore sedan, although rebadged as a Pontiac G8 in North America) was shown at the New York International Auto Show in March 2008. It was slated for release in the third quarter of 2009 for the 2010 model year, but was quickly cancelled before any were sold due to budgeting cuts and Pontiac's near bankruptcy.
 Toyota X-Runner: Concept vehicle displayed by Toyota Australia at the 2003 Melbourne and Sydney International Motor Shows. The body shell was largely based on that of the first generation Avalon (production of which picked up in Australia a few months after it left off in North America, and lasted until 2005), while the suspension and AWD parts were borrowed from the contemporary Lexus RX. It was intended for production, but Toyota of Australia could not get approval from the parent company.

See also

 Car body styles
 Kei truck
 Pickup truck
 Roadster utility
 Truck classification
 Ute (vehicle)

References 

Car body styles
 
Vehicles introduced in 1934
Pickup trucks